Events in 2014 in anime.

Events
AnimeJapan had its first edition in March.

Accolades 
The Tale of Princess Kaguya Best Animated Feature Film and Best Animation by Asia Pacific Screen Awards and the Lost Angeles Film Critics Association respectively. Tamako Love Story won the Best New Face award at the 18th Japan Media Arts Festival Awards. The Wind Rises won the Japan Academy Prize for Animation of the Year at the 37th Japan Academy Prize. Puella Magi Madoka Magica the Movie: Rebellion won the Best Theatrical Film Award at the 19th Animation Kobe Awards. Attack on Titan won the 2014 Tokyo Anime Award Festival for Animation of the Year. Kill la Kill and The Idolmaster Movie: Beyond the Brilliant Future! dominated at the Newtype Anime Awards. Kill la Kill received for Best Character Design, Best Screenplay, Best Sound and Best Picture (TV Broadcast) while Idolmaster was awarded Best Theme Song, Best Picture (Film), Best Director and Best Characters (Female).

Hayao Miyazaki was awarded an honorary Oscar at the 6th Annual Governors Awards.

Releases

Films
A list of anime films that debuted in theaters between 1 January and 31 December 2014.
{| class="wikitable sortable"
!Release date
!English title
!Japanese title
!Director
!Studio
|-
|
|The Idolmaster Movie: Beyond the Brilliant Future!
|THE IDOLM@STER MOVIE Kagayaki no Mukōgawa e!
|Atsushi Nishikori
|A-1 Pictures
|-
|
|Appleseed Alpha
|Appleseed Alpha
|Shinji Aramaki
|Sola Digital Arts
|-
|
|Attack on Titan: Crimson Arrows
|Shingeki no Kyojin Zenpen: Guren no Yumiya 
|Tetsuro Araki
|Wit Studio
|-
|
|Crayon Shin-chan: Serious Battle! Robot Dad Strikes Back!
|Eiga Crayon Shin-chan: Gachinko! Gyakushū no Robo Tō-chan
|Wataru Takahashi
|Shin-Ei Animation
|-
|
|Happiness Charge Pretty Cure The Movie! Ballerina of the Doll Kingdom
|Happiness Charge Pretty Cure!: Ningyō no Kuni no Ballerina
|Chiaki Kon
|Toei Animation
|-
|
|Cardfight!! Vanguard: The Movie
|Gekijōban Cardfight!! Vanguard: Neon Messiah
|Shin Itagaki, Takashi Motoki
|Liden Films
|-
|
|Gekijō-ban gdgd Yōseis tte Iu Eiga wa Dō kana…?
|Gekijō-ban gdgd Yōseis tte Iu Eiga wa Dō kana…? 
|Sōta Sugahara
|Bouncy
|-
|
|Shimajiro and the Whale's Song
|Shimajirō to Kujira no Uta 
|Isamu Hirabayashi
|Benesse Corporation
|-
|
|Hakuoki: Demon of the Fleeting Blossom: Warrior Spirit of the Blue Sky
|Hakuōki Dai-nishō Shikon Sōkyū 
|Osamu Yamasaki
|Studio Deen
|-
|
|Harmonie
|Arumoni
|Yasuhiro Yoshiura
|Studio Rikka, Ultra Super Pictures
|-
|
|Inazuma Eleven: Chōjigen Dream Match
|Inazuma Eleven: Chōjigen Dream Match
|Katsuhito Akiyama
|OLM
|-
|
|Konna Watashi-tachi ga Nariyuki de Heroine ni Natta Kekka www 'Narihero www'
|Konna Watashi-tachi ga Nariyuki de Heroine ni Natta Kekka www 'Narihero www''' 
|Sōta Sugahara
|Bouncy
|-
|
|Lupin the Third: Jigen's Gravestone 
|Lupin the IIIrd: Jigen Daisuke no Bohyō|Takeshi Koike
|Telecom Animation Film
|-
|
|The Big First-Grader and the Small Second-Grader|Ōkii Ichinensei to Chiisana Ninensei|Ayumu Watanabe
|A-1 Pictures
|-
|
|Parol's Future Island
|Paroru no Miraijima|Kazuaki Imai
|Shin-Ei Animation
|-
|
|Black Nest -Chronus-|Kuro no Sumika -Chronus- 
|Naoyuki Onda
|Studio 4°C
|-
|
|Santa Company|Santa Company|Kenji Itoso
|KENJI STUDIO, Nexus
|-
|
|Spochan Battle -for the future-|Spo-chan Taiketsu: Youkai Daikessen|Hiroshi Kubo
|Wao World
|-
|
|Go! Anpanman: Apple Boy and the Wishes For Everyone|Soreike! Anpanman: Ringo Bōya to Minna no Negai|Jun Kawagoe
|TMS/3xCube
|-
|
|Space Brothers #0
|Uchū Kyōdai #0 
|Ayumu Watanabe
|A-1 Pictures
|-
|
|Space Battleship Yamato 2199: Odyssey of the Celestial Ark|Uchū Senkan Yamato 2199: Hoshi-Meguru Hakobune 
|Makoto Bessho, Yutaka Izubuchi
|Xebec
|-
|
|Space Battleship Yamato 2199: A Voyage to Remember|Uchū Senkan Yamato 2199: Tsuioku No Koukai|Takao Kato
|AICXebec
|-
|
|Yūto-kun ga Iku|Yūto-kun ga Iku|Ryo Higuchi
|Shirogumi
|-
|
|Yowamushi Pedal Re:RIDE
|Yowamushi Pedal Re:RIDE|Osamu Nabeshima
|TMS/8PAN
|-
|
|Eagle Talon 7: Her Majesty's Joboob|Taka no Tsume 7 - Joō Heika no Joboob|FROGMAN
|Kaeruotoko Shokai
|-
|
|Buddha 2: The Endless Journey
|Buddha 2: Tezuka Osamu no Budda - Owarinaki tabi|Toshiaki Komura
|Toei Animation, Tezuka Production
|-
|
|Tiger & Bunny: The Rising
|Tiger and Bunny|Yoshitomo Yonetani
|Sunrise
|-
|
|Bodacious Space Pirates: Abyss of Hyperspace
|Mōretsu Pirates: Akuu no Shin'en|Tatsuo Satō
|Satelight
|-
|
|Giovanni's Island|Giovanni no Shima|Mizuho Nishikubo
|Production I.G
|-
|
|Doraemon: New Nobita's Great Demon—Peko and the Exploration Party of Five|Eiga Doraemon Shin Nobita no Daimakyo ~Peko to 5-nin no Tankentai~|Shinnosuke Yakuwa
|Shin-Ei Animation
|-
|
|Pretty Rhythm All Stars Selection Prism Show☆Best Ten Movie
|Gekijō-ban Pretty Rhythm All Stars Selection Prism Show☆Best Ten|Masakazu Hishida
|Tatsunoko Production
|-
|
|Pretty Cure All Stars New Stage 3: Eternal Friends|Purikyua All Stars New Stage 3: Eien no Tomodachi|Kouji Ogawa
|Toei Animation
|-
|
|Sekai-ichi Hatsukoi: The Case of Takafumi Yokozawa 
|Sekai-ichi Hatsukoi: Yokozawa Takafumi no Baai|Chiaki Kon
|Studio Deen
|-
|
|Detective Conan: Dimensional Sniper|Meitantei Konan: Ijigen no Sunaipā|Kobun Shizuno
|TMS Entertainment
|-
|
|Heaven's Lost Property Final: Eternal My Master|Sora no Otoshimono Final: Eternal My Master|Hisashi Saito
|Production IMS
|-
|
|Tamako Love Story
|Tamako no Love Story|Naoko Yamada
|Kyoto Animation
|-
|
|Persona 3 The Movie: Chapter 2, Midsummer Knight's Dream|Gekijōban Persona 3 Dai Ni Shō|Tomohisa Taguchi
|A-1 Pictures
|-
|
|Saint Seiya: Legend of Sanctuary|Saint Seiya Legend of Sanctuary|Keiichi Sato
|Toei Animation
|-
|
|K: Missing Kings 
|K MISSING KINGS
|Shingo Suzuki
|GoHands
|-
|
|Pokémon the Movie: Diancie and the Cocoon of Destruction
|Pokémon The Movie XY "Hakai no Mayu to Dianshī"|Kunihiko Yuyama
|OLM
|-
|
|When Marnie Was There|Omoide no Marnie|Hiromasa Yonebayashi
|Studio Ghibli
|-
|
|Stand by Me Doraemon|Stand by Me Doraemon|Ryūichi Yagi, Takashi Yamazaki
|Shin-Ei Animation, Shirogumi, Robot
|-
|
|New Theatrical Movie Initial D Legend 1: Awakening
|Shin Gekijō-ban Initial D Legend 1 -Kakusei-|Masamitsu Hidaka 
|Sanzigen, Liden Films
|-
|
|Expelled From Paradise|Rakuen Tsuihō - Expelled from Paradise 
|Seiji Mizushima
|Toei AnimationGraphinica
|-
|
|The Last: Naruto the Movie|The Last Naruto the Movie|Tsuneo Kobayashi
|Pierrot
|-
|
|Aikatsu! the Movie|Aikatsu!|Yuichiro Yano
|Sunrise
|}

 OVAs & Specials 
A list of original video animations (OVAs), original net animations (ONAs), original animation DVDs (OADs), and specials released between 1 January and 31 December 2014. Titles listed are named after their series if their associated OVA, special, etc. was not named separately.

 Television series 
A list of anime television series released between 1 January and 31 December 2014.

Highest-grossing films
The top ten anime films of 2014 by worldwide gross are as follows:

Deaths

January
 January 17 – Seizō Katō, 86, voice actor, bladder cancer.
 January 27
 Masaaki Tsukada, 74, voice actor.
 Ichirō Nagai, 82, voice actor, Coronary Artery Disease.

March
 March 8 – Runa Akiyama, 59, voice actress, heart failure.

May
 May 1 – Kōji Yada, 81, voice actor, kidney failure.

November
 November 1 – Kazuko Yanaga, 67, voice actress (Ace wo Nerae!, Armored Trooper Votoms), sepsis.
 November 17 – Rokurō Naya, 82, voice actor (Saint Seiya, Yu Yu Hakusho, Eureka Seven: AO).
 November 28 – Bunta Sugawara, 81, actor (Torakku Yarō, Spirited Away''), liver cancer.

See also
2014 in Japanese television (general)
2014 in Polish television
2014 in Russia
2014 in Serbia
2014 in Ukraine
2014 in television
2014 in animation
2014 in manga

References

External links 
Japanese animated works of the year, listed in the IMDb

Years in anime
2014 in animation
2014 in Japan